Kentford is a village and civil parish in the West Suffolk district of Suffolk in eastern England. In 2021 it had an estimated population of 1125. Located just off the A14, close to the border with Cambridgeshire, it is served by nearby Kennett railway station.

References

External links

Kentford Village Website
St Mary, Kentford Suffolk Churches

Villages in Suffolk
Forest Heath
Civil parishes in Suffolk